The 1996–97 Russian Cup was the fifth season of the Russian Association football knockout tournament since the dissolution of Soviet Union.

First round
17 April 1996.

21 April 1996.

22 April 1996.

Second round
1 May 1996.

2 May 1996.

Third round
30 May 1996.

31 May 1996.

1 June 1996.

Fourth round
Russian Premier League teams FC Zenit St. Petersburg and FC Lada Togliatti started at this stage.

29 June 1996.

30 June 1996.

Round of 32
All the other Russian Premier League teams started at this stage.

Round of 16

Penalty kick by Zenit's Yuriy Vernydub hit the crossbar in the 71st minute.

Quarter-finals

Semi-finals

Final

Played in the earlier stages, but not in the final game:

FC Lokomotiv Moscow: Khasanbi Bidzhiyev (GK), Oleg Pashinin  (DF), Oleg Elyshev (MF), Vitali Veselov (FW), Dmitri Bulykin (FW), Oleh Haras  (FW), Konstantin Kamnev (FW), Valeriy Yablochkin  (FW).

FC Dynamo Moscow: Aleksei Guschin (DF), Sergei Kolotovkin (DF), Yevgeni Korablyov (DF), Rolan Gusev (MF), Yuri Kuznetsov (MF), Aleksandr Grishin (MF), Vitali Kulyov (MF), Aleksei Kutsenko (FW), Yuri Tishkov (FW), Dmitri Cheryshev (FW).

References

Russian Cup seasons
Russian Cup
Cup
Cup